Yevgeni, Yevgeny, Yevgenii or Yevgeniy, also transliterated as Evgeni, Evgeny, Evgenii, Evgeniy or Evgenij is the Russian form of the masculine given name Eugene. People with the name include:
Note: Occasionally, a person may be in more than one section.

Arts and entertainment
Yevgeny Aryeh (1947–2022), Israeli theater director, playwright, scriptwriter and set designer
Yevgeni Bauer (1865–1917), Russian film director and screenwriter
Yevgeni Grishkovetz (born 1967), Russian writer, dramatist, stage director and actor
Evgeny Kissin (born 1971), Russian pianist
Yevgeny Leonov (1926–1994), Soviet and Russian actor
Yevgeni Mokhorev (born 1967), Russian photographer
Evgeny Mravinsky (1903–1988), Russian conductor
Evgeny Svetlanov (1928–2002), Russian conductor
Yevgeni Urbansky (1932–1965), Soviet Russian actor
Yevgeniy Yevstigneyev (1926–1992), Soviet and Russian actor
Yevgeny Yevtushenko (1933–2017), Soviet and Russian poet
Yevgeny Zamyatin (1884–1937), Russian author of political satire and science fiction

Evgeny Zharikov (1941–2012), Soviet and Russian actor

Chess
Evgeny Bareev (born 1966), Russian-Canadian chess grandmaster
Evgeny Gleizerov (born 1963), Russian chess grandmaster
Evgeny Shtembuliak (born 1999), Ukrainian chess grandmaster
Evgeny Tomashevsky (born 1987), Russian chess grandmaster

Sports
Evgeny Alexandrov (born 1982), Russian ice hockey player
Yevgeni Balyaikin (born 1988), Russian footballer
Evgeni Berzin (born 1970), Russian bicycle road racer
Evgeny Busygin (born 1987), Russian ice hockey player
Yevgeni Bushmanov (born 1971), retired Russian football player
Yevgeni Dolgov (born 1969), Soviet and Russian retired football player
Yevgeny Kafelnikov (born 1974), Russian retired tennis player
Yevgeni Kharlachyov (born 1974), Russian retired football player
Yevgeni Korablyov (born 1978), Russian footballer
Evgeny Korolev (born 1988), Kazakh tennis player
Yevgeni Kulik (born 1993), Russian ice hockey player
Evgeny Kuznetsov (born 1992), Russian ice hockey player
Yevgeni Kuznetsov (born 1983), Russian footballer
Evgeny Lapenkov (born 1984), Russian ice hockey player
Yevgeny Lapinsky (1942–1999), Soviet Olympic champion volleyball player
Yevgeni Makeyev (born 1989), Russian football player
Evgeni Malkin (born 1986), Russian ice hockey player in the National Hockey League
Yevgeni Malkov (born 1988), Russian football player
Yevgeny Maskinskov (1930–1985), Soviet athlete who competed mainly in the 50 kilometre walk
Yevgeni Matyugin (born 1981), Moldovan international footballer
Yevgeni Mayorov (1938–1997), ice hockey player who played in the Soviet Hockey League
Yevgeni Minaev (1933–1993), Russian former weightlifter
Yevgeni Mishakov (born 1941), retired ice hockey player
Evgeni Nabokov (born 1975), retired goalie in the National Hockey League
Evgeni Plushenko (born 1982), Russian figure skater and four-time Olympic medalist
Yevgeni Safonov (born 1977), Uzbekistan national team football player
Yevgeni Sidorov (born 1956), Soviet and Russian retired football player and current manager
Evgenii Tiurnev (born 1997), Russian tennis player
Yevgeni Trefilov (born 1955), Russian team handball coach
Yevgeni Varlamov (born 1975), Russian retired football player
Yevgeni Yatchenko (born 1986), Russian footballer
Yevgeni Zimin (born 1947), retired ice hockey player
Evgeni Semenenko (born 2003), Russian figure skater

Other
Evgeny Lifshitz, Russian Theoretical Physicist
Yevgeny Chuplinsky, prolific Russian serial killer
Yevgeny Kaspersky (born 1965), Russian information security expert and entrepreneur
Evgeny Lebedev, Russian-born British newspaper publisher
Evgeny Morozov (born 1984), Belarusian journalist
Yevgeni Nikolayev (1921–1990), Soviet World War II colonel and Hero of the Soviet Union
Yevgeni Pakhomov (1880–1965), Russian, Georgian and Azerbaijani numismatist and archaeologist
Evgeny Paton (1870–1953), Ukrainian and Soviet engineer
Evgeny Perlin (born 1990), Belarusian journalist and television presenter
Yevgeni Preobrazhensky (1886–1937), Old Bolshevik, an economist and a member of the Communist Party of the Soviet Union
Yevgeny Prigozhin (born 1961), Russian oligarch and founder of Wagner Group.
Yevgeny Shaposhnikov (1942–2020), Soviet marshal and last Minister of Defence of the Soviet Union

Russian masculine given names